The 2017 Canberra Raiders season was the 36th in the club's history. Coached by Ricky Stuart and captained by Jarrod Croker, the Raiders competed in the NRL's 2017 Telstra Premiership. They also competed in the 2017 NRL Auckland Nines pre-season tournament.

Squad

Player transfers

Gains

Loses

Fixtures

Auckland Nines

Trials

NRL

Round 1

Round 2

Round 3

Round 4

Round 5

Round 6

Round 7

Round 8

Round 9

Round 10

Round 11

Round 12

Round 13

Round 14

Round 15

Round 16

Round 17

Round 18

Round 19

Round 20

Round 21

Round 22

Round 23

Round 24

Round 25

Round 26 

 Green = Win, Red = Loss, Blue = Bye.

Ladder

Statistics

Representative Call-Ups

Honours

League 
 Dally M Winger of the Year: Jordan Rapana
 Dally M Rookie of the Year: Nick Cotric
 NYC Team of the Year: Jack Murchie

Club 
 Mal Meninga Medal: Junior Paulo
 Rookie of the Year: Nick Cotric
 NRL Coaches Award: Elliott Whitehead
 Fred Daly Memorial Clubman of the Year: Jeff Lima
 NYC Player of the Year: Mikaele Ravalawa
 NYC Coaches Award: Jarred Tuite
 Gordon McLucas Memorial Junior Representative Player of the Year: Emre Guler 
 Geoff Caldwell Career & Education Award: Harry Van Dartel

Feeder Clubs

National Youth Competition 
  Canberra Raiders U20s - 12th, missed finals

New South Wales Cup 
  Mount Pritchard Mounties - 5th, lost elimination final

References

Canberra Raiders seasons
Canberra Raiders season